HVV (Haagse Voetbal Vereniging: Dutch for (The) Hague Football Club) is an amateur football club in The Hague, Netherlands. It was founded in 1883 as an extension of HCC, (The) Hague Cricket Club. In 1978, on the occasion of the club's centenary, Queen Juliana granted the club royal patronage, with prefix Koninklijke ("Royal"), because of its pioneering role in sport, including in the formation of the Royal Dutch Football Association (KNVB) in 1889.  Since then it has been called Koninklijke Haagse Cricket & Voetbal Vereniging (Royal The Hague Cricket & Football Club), abbreviated KHC&VV.  The club's grounds since 1898 have been at the 1,200-capacity "De Diepput", on the border between Benoordenhout and Wassenaar. It now also plays tennis, squash and judo and has around 1750 members.

History
HVV was the most successful Dutch football club prior to World War I, winning ten Dutch championships between 1890 and 1914.
Two of its players won bronze medals with the Dutch side in the 1912 Olympic football tournament.  Subsequently, it was superseded as top club in the Hague by HBS and then ADO.
Its last season in top-flight football was 1932. The introduction of professionalism by the KNVB in 1954 did not affect lower division clubs such as HVV.

Current status
HVV is now an amateur football club. The main squad, HVV 1, was promoted after the 2006–2007 season, and again in 2008–2009 season, and is now playing in the Sunday Tweede Klasse C, the seventh tier of football in the Netherlands, in KNVB District West 2.

Honours

Football
In May 2007, the KNVB endorsed a scheme for teams to wear one gold star on their shirts for every ten national championships won; HVV are one of four teams eligible for a star, alongside Ajax, Feyenoord, and PSV, three former European champions. The first shirt emblazoned with the gold star will be sold at an auction on 24 November 2007 to mark the opening of the club's new clubhouse.
Eerste Klasse West & Dutch national champions: 10
 1890–91, 1895–96, 1899–1900, 1900–01, 1901–02, 1902–03, 1904–05, 1906–07, 1909–10, 1913–14
KNVB Cup: 1 1902–03KNVB Cup Runner-up: 3 1898–99, 1903–04, 1909–10

Cricket
HCC is the most successful cricket team in Dutch history.  It won the first, unofficial, national championship in 1884. Its first XI is still in the top division. It was so dominant after World War I that its second XI was allowed into the top division in 1925. The following year these two sides shared the national title, and the second XI won it outright on several occasions.Dutch champions: 49
 1895, 1899, 1900(jt.), 1903, 1910(jt.), 1912, 1916, 1917, 1919, 1920, 1921, 1922, 1923, 1925, 1926 (HCC and HCC(II) shared), 1927, 1928(II), 1929(II), 1930(II), 1931, 1932(II jt.), 1933, 1934, 1935(II), 1936, 1940(jt.), 1941, 1947, 1952(II), 1955(II), 1956, 1957, 1958, 1959, 1960, 1961(II), 1963, 1964, 1965 (jt.), 1966, 1967, 1968, 1972, 1973(II), 1976, 1985, 2008, 2020, 2022

Coaching history

 Jimmy Yates (1904)
 Fred Coles (1908–1913)
 Fred Warburton (1913–1935)
 Fred Pagnam (1935), interim
 Bert Bellamy (1935–1937)
 Thomas Clay (1937–1939)
 Bernard Oxley (1939–1940)
 Gerrit van Wijhe (1940–1943)
 Jan Wolf (1943–1945)
 Gerrit van Osch (1945–1964)
 Zoltan Szalai (1964), interim
 Gerrit van Osch (1964–1966)
 Cock Kroon (1966–1968)
 Theo Creemers (1968–1969)
 Harry de Vos (1969–1971)
 Jan Mak (1971), interim
 Geoffrey Burch (1971–1981)
 Ab Aalberts (1981–1983)
 Geert van Vugt (1983–1986)
 Rob Wijnstok (1986–1989)
 Frank Bijloos (1989–1992)
 André Wetzel (1992–1997)
 Kees Mol (1997), interim
 Frank Kuyl (1997–2000)
 Wim Visser (2000–2003)
 Jan van der Laan (2003–2005)
 Harold Tjaden (2005–2007)
 Kees Mol (2007–2010)
 Faisal Soekhai (2010–2011)
 Hans Bal en Steven Faber (2011–2012), interim
 Albert van der Dussen (2012–2015)
 Edmund Vriesde (2015), interim
 Edmund Vriesde (2015–2018)
 André Wetzel (2018 – present)

Notable players
The following HVV footballers won caps for the Netherlands:

Law Adam
Jan van Breda Kolff (footballer)
Miel Campioni
Lo La Chapelle
Constant Feith
Karel Heijting
Boelie Kessler
Dé Kessler
Dolf Kessler
Tonny Kessler
Guus Lutjens
Dick MacNeill
Miel Mundt
Ed Sol

References
Originally based on the Dutch Wikipedia articles:
 this version of the "HVV (Den Haag)" article
 this version of the "HCVV" article

Notes

External links
Official website for KHC&VV

Multi-sport clubs in the Netherlands
Cricket teams in the Netherlands
Football clubs in the Netherlands
Football clubs in The Hague
Association football clubs established in 1883
1883 establishments in the Netherlands